The Italian language in Venezuela has been present since colonial times in the areas around Caracas, Maracay, Valencia, Maracaibo and the Andes mountains. The language is found in many idiomatic sentences and words of Venezuelan Spanish. There are around 200,000 Italian-speakers in the country, turning it in the second most spoken language in Venezuela, after Spanish.

History

The name of Venezuela itself comes from the Italian Amerigo Vespucci, who called the area "Little Venice" in a typical Italian expression. Some Italians participated in the first European colonies in Venezuela, mainly on the island of Margarita and in Cumaná, the first European city in the Americas, but their influence on the local language was very limited.

During the Venezuelan Wars of Independence some Italians helped Simón Bolivar against the Spanish Empire and they brought some Italian military words to Venezuelan Spanish. The military officer Agostino Codazzi created the first "Atlante" of Venezuela and - as a consequence - many geographical words in Venezuela are loanwords from Italian.

In the second half of the 20th century, more than 300,000 Italians moved to Venezuela and left their linguistic imprint on the local vocabulary: "Ciao" is now a usual friendly salute in Caracas, for example. There are even expressions among local young people that mix Italian and Spanish words: "Muérete que chao" is an example.

Indeed after WWII came a huge emigration to Venezuela from Italy and the Italian language started to get importance in the country. The modisms of the upper class in Caracas (called "Sifrinos") are full of Italian words and expressions.

Today, there are more than 5 million Venezuelans with some Italian roots: some young Italo-Venezuelans in Caracas use slang mixing Italian dialect and Spanish among themselves. Italians also influenced Venezuelan accent, given its slight sing-songy intonation, like Rioplatense Spanish.

Nearly all the Italians speaking the Italian language in Venezuela live in the half of the country north of the Orinoco-Apure rivers, while only a few thousands live in the Ciudad Bolivar-Ciudad Guayana and San Felipe areas of the Apure-Amazonas-Bolivar states.

Italian language teaching in Venezuela

In the 2000s there are nearly 50,000 Italians residing in Venezuela who speak a variety of Italian with their sons and daughters (second generation Italo-Venezuelans). 

The teaching of the Italian language is starting to be better implemented among the nearly one million Venezuelans who are of Italian descent, but there are only a few Italian language institutions in Venezuela.

Indeed, the Italian community has some private Italian schools in the country.  In the metropolitan area of Caracas the best school is the "Agustin Codazzi"  (with courses from elementary to high school), while there are others in the interior of Venezuela (like in Puerto La Cruz the "Colegio Angelo De Marta" and in Barquisimeto the "Colegio Agazzi").

According to the Italian Embassy in Caracas the "...Italian language teaching is guaranteed by the presence of a consistent number of private Venezuelan schools and institutions, where Italian language courses and Italian literature are active. Other similar courses are organized and sponsored by the Italian Ministry of Foreign Affairs and Regional Associations.The Didactic Office of the General Consulate of Caracas, together with this Embassy, is negotiating an Agreement with the Venezuelan Authorities for the recognition of the Study Diplomas emitted by the Italian School (in Venezuela there is a Civil Association called "Agostino Codazzi" which offers the complete didactic cycle from elementary to high school) so that there can be access to the University system in Venezuela with an Italian high school diploma.Since 2002, the Italian Government has become the promoter for a provision which makes it mandatory to teach Italian as a second language in a consistent number of public and private schools within Venezuela..."

List of some Italian words in Venezuelan Spanish
Balurdo. Strange kind of stupid. From "Balordo".
Barco. From the Italian "Barca" (boat).
Birra. Beer. From "Birra".
Calarse. To digest (or sustain) something bad. From "Calarsi" with the same meaning.
Chao. From "Ciao".
Comadre. Godmother. From "Comare".
Compadre. Godfather (and even: "special friend"). From "Compare"
Contorno. Side dish. From "Contorno".
Cretino. Stupid. From "Cretino".
Gafo. Stupid. From "Cafone" (low class peasant).
Lasaña. Food. From the Italian "Lasagna" (a food made with pasta and meat).
Macho. Strong man. From the Italian "Maschio".
Malandro. A thug. From the Italian "Malandrino".
Milanesa. Food. From "Milanese" (a food made with meat and bread).
Mezanina. Building. From "Mezzanina" (intermediate floor in a building. Normally between groundfloor and first floor).
Mortadela. Food. From "Mortadella" (a big sausage made from pork and chicken)
Paisano. From "paesano", meaning an Italian (or southern European) immigrant
Paneton. From "panettone", meaning an Italian christmas bread
Pasticho. From "pasticcio" (a lasagna).
’’’Piccina/Piccino’’’. Little one, young child in Italian. Term of endearment
Pico. Geographical term meaning the top of a mountain. From "Picco".
Piñata. From "pignatta" (a bowl).
Pizza'. Food. From the Italian "Pizza".
Radio. Radio. From the Italian "Radio"
Terraza. Balcony. From the Italian "Terrazza"

See also
 Italy–Venezuela relations
 Italo-Venezuelans
 Italianism
 List of Spanish words borrowed from Italian
 Venezuelan Spanish

References

Bibliography
 Guido Gómez de Silva, Guido. Breve diccionario etimológico de la lengua española Madrid. 
 Santander Laya-Garrido, Alfonso. Los Italianos forjadores de la nacionalidad y del desarrollo economico en Venezuela. Editorial Vadell. Valencia, 1978.
 Vannini, Marisa. Italia y los Italianos en la Historia y en la Cultura de Venezuela. Oficina Central de Información. Caracas, 1966

External links
 Dictionary of Venezuelan Modisms and words (in Spanish)

European-Venezuelan culture
Italian Venezuelan
Venezuela
Languages of Venezuela
Italy–Venezuela relations